Knox Chamblin (December 28, 1935 – February 7, 2012) was a pastor and professor emeritus of New Testament at Reformed Theological Seminary in Jackson, Mississippi. He earned the B.D. and Th.M degrees in 1961 at Columbia Theological Seminary and, in 1975, earned the Th.D. degree from Union Theological Seminary in Richmond, Virginia. He taught for thirty-four years, first at Belhaven College (now Belhaven University) in Jackson, Mississippi, then at Reformed Theological Seminary until his retirement in 2001. He taught the theology of the New Testament and explored and critiqued the theology, life, and writings of C. S. Lewis. He published Matthew Volume 1 (Chapters 1-13): A Mentor Commentary.  Volume 2 of this commentary, covering Matthew 14-28, soon followed.

References

American Calvinist and Reformed theologians
1935 births
2012 deaths
Columbia Theological Seminary alumni
Union Presbyterian Seminary alumni
Place of birth missing
Belhaven University
20th-century Calvinist and Reformed theologians
21st-century Calvinist and Reformed theologians